In mathematics, homological conjectures have been a focus of research activity in commutative algebra since the early 1960s. They concern a number of interrelated (sometimes surprisingly so) conjectures relating various homological properties of a commutative ring to its internal ring structure, particularly its Krull dimension and depth.

The following list given by Melvin Hochster is considered definitive for this area.

 The Zero Divisor Theorem.
 Bass's Question. If  has a finite injective resolution then  is a Cohen–Macaulay ring.
 The Intersection Theorem. If  has finite length, then the Krull dimension of N (i.e., the dimension of R modulo the annihilator of N) is at most the projective dimension of M.
 The New Intersection Theorem. Let  denote a finite complex of free R-modules such that  has finite length but is not 0. Then the (Krull dimension) .
 The Improved New Intersection Conjecture.
 The Direct Summand Conjecture. If  is a module-finite ring extension with R regular (here, R need not be local but the problem reduces at once to the local case), then R is a direct summand of S as an R-module. The conjecture was proven by Yves André using a theory of perfectoid spaces.
 The Canonical Element Conjecture. Lift the identity map  to a map of complexes.
 Existence of Balanced Big Cohen–Macaulay Modules Conjecture. There exists a (not necessarily finitely generated) R-module W such that mRW ≠ W and every system of parameters for R is a regular sequence on W.
 Cohen-Macaulayness of Direct Summands Conjecture. If R is a direct summand of a regular ring S as an R-module, then R is Cohen–Macaulay (R need not be local, but the result reduces at once to the case where R is local).
 The Vanishing Conjecture for Maps of Tor. Let  be homomorphisms where R is not necessarily local (one can reduce to that case however), with A, S regular and R finitely generated as an A-module. Let W be any A-module. Then the map  is zero for all .
 The Strong Direct Summand Conjecture. Then  is a direct summand of Q considered as R-modules.
 Existence of Weakly Functorial Big Cohen-Macaulay Algebras Conjecture. Let  be a local homomorphism of complete local domains. Then there exists an R-algebra BR that is a balanced big Cohen–Macaulay algebra for R, an S-algebra  that is a balanced big Cohen-Macaulay algebra for S, and a homomorphism BR → BS such that the natural square given by these maps commutes.
 Serre's Conjecture on Multiplicities. (cf. Serre's multiplicity conjectures.) Suppose that R is regular of dimension d and that  has finite length.  Then , defined as the alternating sum of the lengths of the modules  is 0 if , and is positive if the sum is equal to d. (N.B. Jean-Pierre Serre proved that the sum cannot exceed d.)
 Small Cohen–Macaulay Modules Conjecture. If R is complete, then there exists a finitely-generated R-module  such that some (equivalently every) system of parameters for R is a regular sequence on M.

References

 Homological conjectures, old and new, Melvin Hochster, Illinois Journal of Mathematics Volume 51, Number 1 (2007), 151-169.
 On the direct summand conjecture and its derived variant by Bhargav Bhatt.

Commutative algebra
Homological algebra
Conjectures
Unsolved problems in mathematics